The North Elbian Evangelical Lutheran Church (NEK) was a Lutheran regional church in Northern Germany which emerged from a merger of four churches in 1977 and merged with two more churches in 2012. The NEK largely covered the area of the states of Schleswig-Holstein and Hamburg where it was the most important Christian denomination. It had 2.1 million members (as of 2006) in 595 parishes, constituting 46% of the population in its ambit.

In May 2012 the NEK, the Evangelical Lutheran Church of Mecklenburg and the Pomeranian Evangelical Church merged into Evangelical Lutheran Church in Northern Germany.

The NEK was a full member of the Evangelical Church in Germany (EKD), the United Evangelical Lutheran Church of Germany (VELKD), and the Lutheran World Federation (joined 1977). The church was also a member of the Community of Protestant Churches in Europe.

History
The North Elbian Evangelical Lutheran Church was founded in 1977 by the merger of four former state churches: 
 the Evangelical Lutheran State Church of Eutin, which had been split off from the Evangelical Lutheran Church in Oldenburg and represented the former Prince-Bishopric of Lübeck.
 the Evangelical Lutheran Church in the State of Hamburg;
 the Evangelical Lutheran Church in the State of Lübeck;
 the Evangelical Lutheran State Church of Schleswig-Holstein;

It is named after its ambit mostly located north of the River Elbe. In 1992 Maria Jepsen was the first woman to become a bishop in the North Elbian Evangelical Lutheran Church. At Pentecost 2012 it merged with the Evangelical Lutheran State Church of Mecklenburg and the Pomeranian Evangelical Church to form the new Evangelical Lutheran Church in Northern Germany.

Prominent buildings

The most prominent church buildings and sees of the bishops were Schleswig Cathedral, Lübeck Cathedral and St. Michaelis in Hamburg.

Practices

Ordination of women and blessing of same-sex unions were allowed.

List of bishops

Bishops of the Hamburg district (Sprengel Hamburg; 1977–2008)

The preaching venue of the bishop was the new St. Nicholas Church (till 1987) and thereafter St. Michael's. 
 1977–1983: Hans-Otto Wölber
 1983–1992: Peter Krusche
 1992–2008: Maria Jepsen

Bishops of the Holstein-Lübeck district (Sprengel Holstein-Lübeck; 1977–2008)
The preaching venue of the bishop was the Lübeck Cathedral.
 1964–1981: Friedrich Hübner, until 1977 bishop of Holstein in Kiel for the Evangelical-Lutheran State Church of Schleswig-Holstein
 1981–1991: Ulrich Wilckens
 1991–2001: Karl Ludwig Kohlwage
 2001–2008: Bärbel Wartenberg-Potter

Bishops of the Schleswig district (Sprengel Schleswig; 1977–2008)

The preaching venue of the bishop was the Schleswig Cathedral.
 1967–1978: Alfred Petersen, until 1977 bishop of Schleswig for the Evangelical-Lutheran State Church of Schleswig-Holstein
 1979–1990: Karlheinz Stoll
 1991–2008: Hans-Christian Knuth
 2008–today: Gerhard Ulrich

Bishops of the Hamburg and Lübeck district (Sprengel Hamburg und Lübeck; since 2008)

The preaching venue of the bishop is the St. Michaelis Church, Hamburg.
 2008–2010: Maria Jepsen
 2011–today: Kirsten Fehrs

Bishops of the Schleswig and Holstein district (Sprengel Schleswig und Holstein; since 2008)
The preaching venue of the bishop is the Schleswig Cathedral. 
 2008–2014: Gerhard Ulrich
 2014–today:

References

External links
 North Elbian Evangelical Lutheran Church (English)
 Evangelical Church in Germany (English)

Christianity in Schleswig-Holstein
Christianity in Hamburg
Members of the World Council of Churches
Former member churches of the Evangelical Church in Germany
Lutheran denominations established in the 20th century
Christian organizations established in 1977
Religious organizations disestablished in 2012
History of Lutheranism in Germany
1977 establishments in West Germany
2012 disestablishments in Germany